Krishna Murari Gautam  or popularly known as the Chatyang Master is a writer, poet, comedian and social activist of Nepal. He founded  a NGO called Ageing  Nepal dedicated  to  the  betterment of the ageing population which was awarded in 2020. He has participated in numerous national and international courses and conferences, has guided research and authored books on various issues pertaining to aged populations in Nepal.

Career
Gautam did master's degree in Economics from an Australian university  and  began  his  professional  career  in  1978  as  an  assistant  lecturer.  He  joined the Agriculture Projects Services Center in 1979 as an Agriculture Specialist. In 1988,  he was appointed as the Senior  Agriculture  Economist. He also established a consulting company and worked in various rural development projects in Nepal, China, and India. He has training and substantial experience in various subjects ranging from media to alternative energy technologies. He worked for the World Bank to share his knowledge with farmers in China and for the USAID to work in India. He also hosted a radio talk show on Radio Sagarmatha.

Work for ageing people
In 2009 when his father passed by Alzheimer he was motivated to establish NGO for senior citizens. The NGO was named Ageing Nepal. This organization was awarded UNESCO King Sejong Literacy Prize in 2020.

Awards
Bhairab Award in 2071BS

References

External links
 Interview in Nepali language 
 NGO website

Nepalese writers
Nepalese poets
Year of birth missing (living people)
Living people
Nepalese male comedians